Ellenbrook is a northeastern suburb of Perth, Western Australia, about  from Perth's central business district (CBD), located within the City of Swan. Ellenbrook, and its neighbouring suburbs of The Vines and Aveley, are unusual for Perth in being a significant distance from neighbouring suburbs. Given this relative isolation and the distance from the CBD, Ellenbrook has been designed and developed as a self-sustainable community. Since the upgrade of Gnangara Road and the completion of the Tonkin Highway Northlink, access to Ellenbrook has improved. The Morley–Ellenbrook railway line is well underway as at June 2021 and this will enable better public transport. At the time of the 2016 census there were 22,681 people living in the gazetted suburb, by June 2018, it was estimated that the urban population for Ellenbrook and surrounds had grown to 41,382. It is envisioned that Ellenbrook will eventually become a satellite city, with a population of 80,000.

Transport links
Direct access to Tonkin Highway is nearby, with The Promenade interchange being the main access to Ellenbrook since the highway was extended northwards as part of the NorthLink WA road project in 2019. Alternatively, Tonkin Highway also has a junction with Gnangara Road, which links Ellenbrook with Wangara and the northern suburbs. West Swan Road, Drumpellier Drive (formerly Lord Street), and Reid Highway are also nearby. Bus services link Ellenbrook with Morley and Bassendean railway station. A journey to the Perth CBD by public transport takes approximately 60 minutes. Before 2017, public transport was limited in the evenings and weekends, but in that year, Transperth introduced upgraded services, including an hourly evening connection to Bassendean railway station and thus the city. In August 2017, a bus route was introduced which connected Ellenbrook to Whitfords railway station, via Gnangara Road.

During the campaign for the 2008 Western Australian election, both major political parties committed to building a rail line. The 15 km line was expected to cost $850 million and be finished around 2015, with construction starting around 2012. However, in May 2010, the premier Colin Barnett confirmed that his government would not be proceeding with the development. Following the election of the McGowan Labor government in 2017, it was announced that the Ellenbrook railway would be constructed as a part of the Metronet project with a projected opening date of 2024. Ellenbrook railway station is planned to be constructed as the terminus of the line on The Parkway in the Ellenbrook town centre.

History and development
The name Ellenbrook is derived from the nearby Ellen Brook, a tributary of the Swan River named after Ellen Stirling, the wife of Captain James Stirling, Western Australia's first governor.

The development of the suburb was conducted by the Ellenbrook Joint Venture — a partnership between the Department of Housing and Works and Morella Pty Ltd now known as LWP Property Group Pty Ltd.

The following is a fact sheet produced by the Urban Development Institute of Australia (UDIA) providing details about the development:
 The sites were acquired by the respective owners in the 1980s as rural land. They had commenced informal rezoning discussions by 1989.
 Given the challenges associated with rezoning and servicing, the owners formed the joint venture in November 1991 (ie the need for critical mass was recognised).
 The environmental approval involved a Public Environmental Review (PER) process.
 The site was rezoned to Urban Deferred in December 1992 and to urban in December 1993.
 Given its location adjacent to the Gnangara Water Mound, the Swan Valley and its distance from existing services, the rezoning was extremely challenging.
 Structure planning occurred in detail during 1993, to facilitate receipt of planning approval in 1994.
 The scale of the project demanded extensive consultation with all service providers, the local community groups and significant market research.
 The Environmental approvals, including drainage and nutrient management, together with provision of water and sewer services, represented the major challenges.
 Over $2m was expended by the owners in meeting the requirements of the rezoning process.
 Approximately  of land (25% of the site) was set aside for conservation.

Ellenbrook is a masterplanned community developed in stages called "villages" which are then given storybook English names such as Woodlake or Charlotte's Vineyard. The first, Woodlake Village, was built on the site of a former sand quarry,  with development commencing in 1994. Subsequent villages include The Bridges, Coolamon, Morgan Fields, Charlotte's Vineyard, Malvern Springs, Lexia and Annie's Landing.

The Ellenbrook town centre is well established, hosting  of retail space and major retailers, Coles, Woolworths, Big W, Kmart, Spotlight, and Spudshed as well as around 100 speciality stores and national retail giant Bunnings Warehouse.

Natural features
Existing woodlands and wetlands (prior to development) such as conservation category wetlands, have been incorporated as public open spaces throughout the suburb. The Gnangara Pine Plantation just west of the suburb, features walks and picnic facilities accessible from Ellenbrook.

To the north of Ellenbrook, over 300 hectares of land was ceded for conservation prior to development, and is now protected under the Perth metropolitan Bush Forever strategy.

Education facilities
Ellenbrook and surrounds have a wide variety of primary and secondary schools, both public and private.

Primary schools in the area include:
 Arbor Grove Primary School - state primary school located in Charlotte's Vineyard
 Ellen Stirling Primary School - state primary school located in Coolamon
 Ellenbrook Christian College - a private kindergarten to year 12 school located in The Bridges
 Ellenbrook Independent Primary School - state primary school located in Woodlake
 Malvern Springs Primary School  - state primary school located in the village of Malvern Springs
 St. Helena's Catholic Primary School - Catholic primary school located in Woodlake
 Anne Hamersley Primary School  - state primary school located in the village of Annie's Landing
 Swan Valley Anglican Community School - kindergarten to year 12 Anglican school located in nearby Aveley
 Aveley Primary School - state primary school in nearby Aveley
Aveley North Primary School - recently opened state primary school located close by in the northern section of Aveley.

High schools in the area include:
 Ellenbrook Christian College - private school that caters for students from Kindergarten to year 12.
 Ellenbrook Secondary College - public school serving years 7 to 12.
 Holy Cross College - Catholic high school which in as of now is catering for students from Years Pre-K through to 12
 Swan Valley Anglican Community School - An Anglican school located in the neighboring suburb of Aveley, serving students from Kindergarten to year 12.
 Aveley Secondary College - public school located in the North of Ellenbrook, opening in 2018 catering to only Year 7 students - Adding a new year group annually. As of 2021, the school serves students in Years 7 to 10 and by the year 2023, the school will serve students in Years 7 to 12.

Ellenbrook Community Library, operated by the City of Swan, is co-located within Ellenbrook Secondary College and Performing Arts Centre.

Sporting and leisure facilities
There are four main sporting grounds in Ellenbrook: Woodlake Sports Ground, Coolamon Oval, Charlotte’s Vineyard Oval and Ellenbrook District Open Space (EDOS). Coolamon Oval and Ellenbrook District Open Space (EDOS) have clubroom and changing facilities and are the home of the Ellenbrook Eels Senior Football Club, the Ellenbrook Dockers Junior Football club (Australian Rules) and the Ellenbrook Rangers.

Other facilities include:

 Dual-purpose tennis/basketball courts at Woodlake Park and Coolamon Oval.
 Cricket nets on Woodlake Oval, Coolamon Oval and EDOS.
 Skateparks at Woodlake Oval and Coolamon Oval.
 A water park, aimed at younger children, completed in late 2009 located in the town centre adjacent to the library.
 Exercise facilities located at EDOS. 
 Ellenbrook Men’s Shed located adjacent to the water park.
 Ellenbrook Community Garden also located adjacent to the water park.

The suburb is also home to a junior and senior soccer club, Ellenbrook United FC.

Planning for a recreation and aquatic centre adjacent to EDOS and Aveley Secondary College in Ellenbrook has commenced and will host: a 25m indoor lane lap pool, warm water pool, spa, sauna, steam facilities, indoor multipurpose sports courts, gym/ health club, group fitness rooms, café, crèche, changing facilities and car parking.

References

External links
 Official Site
 UDIA Case Study
Community Website
 Insurance Commission of WA (ICWA) - Details of Ellenbrook Restrictive Covenant
 ICWA Retail Masterplan (The Shops development plan)

 
Suburbs of Perth, Western Australia
Suburbs and localities in the City of Swan